Wanderlust is a 2006 documentary film on road movies and their effect on American culture.

Cast 

In alphabetical order

 Allison Anders as Herself
 Eszter Balint archive footage as Eva (Stranger Than Paradise, 1984)
 Jeanine Basinger as Herself
 Robert Benton as Himself
 Laurie Bird archive footage as the Girl (Two-Lane Blacktop, 1971) (uncredited)
 Karen Black archive footage as Herself
 Peter Bogdanovich as Himself
 Albert Brooks archive footage as David Howard (Lost in America, 1985)
 Jeff Brouws as Himself
 William S. Burroughs archive footage as Tom the Priest (Drugstore Cowboy, 1989)
 Alfonso Cuarón as Himself
 Kat Dennings as Lila
 Matt Dillon voice also archive footage
 Richard Edson archive footage as Eddie (Stranger Than Paradise, 1984)
 Chris Eyre as Himself
 Peter Fonda archive footage
 Monte Hellman as Himself
 Arthur Hiller as Himself
 Dennis Hopper as Himself also archive footage
 Callie Khouri as Herself
 László Kovács as Himself
 David Laderman as Himself
 Adriane Lenox voice and Herself
 Barry Levinson as Himself
 Cleavon Little archive footage as Super Soul (Vanishing Point, 1971)
 John Lurie archive footage as Willie (Stranger Than Paradise, 1984)
 Garry Marshall archive footage the Desert Inn Casino Manager (Lost in America, 1985)
 Tom McCarthy as Jim
 Timothy McVeigh archive footage and Himself (uncredited)
 Erik Menendez archive footage and Himself (uncredited)
 Lyle Menendez archive footage and Himself (uncredited)
 Mira Nair as Herself
 Hal Needham as Himself
 Barry Newman archive footage as Kowalski (Vanishing Point, 1971)
 Pat Nixon archive footage and Herself
 Richard Nixon archive footage and Himself
 Warren Oates archive footage as G.T.O. (Two-Lane Blacktop, 1971) (uncredited)
 Alexander Payne as Himself
 Ronald Reagan archive footage and Himself
 Paul Reubens as Himself also archive footage
 Peter Riegert as Himself (voice)
 David O. Russell as Himself
 Walter Salles as Himself
 Richard C. Sarafian as Himself
 Paul Rudd as Calvin
 Jerry Schatzberg as Himself
 Sam Shepard as Himself
 Stephen Shore as Himself
 O. J. Simpson as Himself archive footage (uncredited)
 Gary Sinise as Himself (voice)
 Harry Dean Stanton as Himself
 James Taylor archive footage as The Driver (Two-Lane Blacktop, 1971) (uncredited)
 Lili Taylor as Herself (voice)
 James Urbaniak as Himself (voice)
 Gus Van Sant as Himself
 Wim Wenders as Himself
 Dennis Wilson archive footage as The Mechanic (Two-Lane Blacktop, 1971) (uncredited)
 Rudy Wurlitzer as Himself
 Vilmos Zsigmond as Himself

External links 

 
 
 

Documentary films about films
American road movies
Films directed by Shari Springer Berman and Robert Pulcini
2006 television films
2006 films
2006 documentary films
American documentary television films
Documentary films about the cinema of the United States
2000s American films